Dolomedes striatus is a species of nursery web spider in the family Pisauridae. It is found in the United States and Canada.

References

External links

 

	

Dolomedes
Articles created by Qbugbot
Spiders described in 1869